Cao Jun (died August or September 259), courtesy name Zi'an, was a prince of the state of Cao Wei in the Three Kingdoms period of China. He was a son of Cao Cao, a warlord who rose to prominence towards the end of the Han dynasty and laid the foundation for the Cao Wei state. His mother was Lady Qin (秦夫人), a concubine of Cao Cao. She also bore Cao Cao another son, Cao Xuan. Cao Jun was enfeoffed as the Marquis of Mei (郿侯) in 216 during the reign of Emperor Xian in the Eastern Han dynasty. His marquisate was changed to Xiangyi County (襄邑縣; present-day Sui County, Shangqiu, Henan) in the following year. In 221, a year after Cao Jun's elder half-brother Cao Pi ended the Han dynasty and established the state of Cao Wei, Cao Jun was promoted from a marquis to a duke. In 222, he received the title "Prince of Chenliu" (陳留王). Two years later, his princedom was changed from Chenliu (陳留; around present-day Kaifeng, Henan) to Xiangyi County. In 232, during the reign of Cao Pi's son Cao Rui, Cao Jun's princedom was relocated back to Chenliu. Cao Jun died in 259 during the reign of Cao Mao.

Cao Jun was succeeded by his son, Cao Ao (曹澳). The number of taxable households in Cao Ao's princedom increased throughout the reigns of the Wei emperors until it reached 4,700.

See also
 Cao Wei family trees#Lady Qin
 Lists of people of the Three Kingdoms

Notes

References

 Chen, Shou (3rd century). Records of the Three Kingdoms (Sanguozhi).

Year of birth unknown
259 deaths
Family of Cao Cao
Cao Wei imperial princes